is a Japanese former professional footballer who played as a midfielder.

Club career statistics
.

References

External links

1983 births
Living people
Tokyo Gakugei University alumni
Association football people from Tokyo Metropolis
People from Fuchū, Tokyo
Japanese footballers
J1 League players
J2 League players
Ventforet Kofu players
Fagiano Okayama players
Association football midfielders
Universiade gold medalists for Japan
Universiade medalists in football